Luis Hernández (born 1907, date of death unknown) was a Mexican fencer. He competed in the individual épée event at the 1928 Summer Olympics.

References

External links
 

1907 births
Year of death missing
Mexican male épée fencers
Olympic fencers of Mexico
Fencers at the 1928 Summer Olympics
20th-century Mexican people